This article contains a list of encyclicals of Pope Pius XI.  Pius XI issued 31 papal encyclicals during his reign as pope and was considering one at his death.

At the time of his death, Pius XI was reviewing an early version of an additional encyclical, Humani generis unitas (On the Unity of the Human Race), on the church, anti-Semitism, racism, and persecution of Jews.

Encyclicals
Pius 11